Fatias de Tomar ("Slices of Tomar") is a Portuguese dessert from Tomar. They were originally made by nuns in the Convent of Christ.

References

Portuguese cuisine
Portuguese desserts